Jordan Lasley (born November 13, 1996) is an American football wide receiver who is a free agent. He played college football at UCLA and was drafted by the Baltimore Ravens in the fifth round of the 2018 NFL Draft.

Early years
Lasley attended Serra High School in Gardena, California. As a senior, he had 34 receptions for 833 yards and 14 touchdowns. He committed to play football for the UCLA Bruins in June 2013.

College career
Lasley did not play as a true freshman in 2014 and chose to redshirt.

As a redshirt freshman in 2015, Lasley played in ten games, catching three passes for 17 yards.

In 2016, Lasley had a breakout season, appearing in 11 of UCLA's 12 games, having 41 receptions for 620 yards and five touchdowns.

As a redshirt junior in 2017, Lasley played in nine games, missing three due to suspension. He caught 69 passes for 1,264 yards and nine touchdowns; he led the Pac-12 Conference in receiving yards despite his suspension. After the season, he declared for the 2018 NFL Draft.

Professional career

Baltimore Ravens
Lasley was drafted by the Baltimore Ravens in the fifth round (162nd overall) of the 2018 NFL Draft.

On July 31, 2019, Lasley was waived by the Ravens after getting into a fight with multiple teammates in practice then later throwing a football into a pond in celebration of a preseason practice touchdown catch.

Oakland Raiders
On August 1, 2019, Lasley was claimed off waivers by the Oakland Raiders. On August 18, 2019, he was waived.

Detroit Lions
On August 20, 2019, Lasley was signed by the Detroit Lions. He was released during final roster cuts on August 30, 2019.

St. Louis BattleHawks
In October 2019, Lasley was selected by the St. Louis BattleHawks in the 2020 XFL Draft. He was waived on January 18, 2020.

Montreal Alouettes
Lasley signed with the Montreal Alouettes of the CFL on January 22, 2021. He was released on July 13, 2021.

Tampa Bay Bandits
Lasley was selected by the Tampa Bay Bandits in the 2022 USFL Draft. He was released on April 28, 2022.

References

External links
UCLA Bruins football bio

1996 births
Living people
Players of American football from Compton, California
American football wide receivers
UCLA Bruins football players
Baltimore Ravens players
Detroit Lions players
Oakland Raiders players
St. Louis BattleHawks players
Montreal Alouettes players
Tampa Bay Bandits (2022) players